Longplayer is a self-extending composition by British composer and musician Jem Finer which is designed to continue for 1000 years. It started to play at midnight on 1 January 2000, and if all goes as planned, it will continue without repetition until 31 December 2999.

Longplayer can be played on any format - except the record players, 8 track, cassette tapes and any device created prior to early 1990s, including ones not yet invented, and is thus not tied to any one form of technology. There have also been several live performances and future performances continue to be planned. It began as an original commission by arts organisation Artangel and is currently maintained by the Longplayer Trust and is located in Bow Creek Lighthouse, Trinity Buoy Wharf on the north bank of the River Thames.

History

Longplayer is based on an existing piece of music, 20 minutes and 20 seconds in length, which is processed by computer using a simple algorithm. This gives a large number of variations, which, when played consecutively, gives a total expected runtime of 1000 years. It is played on a single instrument consisting of 234 Tibetan singing bowls and gongs of different sizes, which are able to create a range of sounds by either striking or rolling pieces of wood around the rims. This source music was recorded in December 1999. It was commissioned by Artangel. The piece is described as reflecting on the concepts of time and impermanence from a cosmological and philosophical perspective, and questions traditional ideas about composition sound, time and duration.

The piece was the conclusion of several years' study into musical systems by Finer and is written as a self generating computer programme. According to Finer, the idea first came to him on the back of a tour bus whilst he was a musician in the folk band The Pogues. He began working on the programming in 1995, for which he learned several computer programming languages before finally settling on SuperCollider, a language which uses algorithms to organise notation, data or MIDI to compose music, sometimes known as algorithmic composition.  The programme is regularly transferred from one motherboard to another in order that the software remains continuously viable. As of 2015 this was operated by a wall of Apple computers in the Bow Creek Lighthouse. The music is produced by simple mechanical processes, and Tibetan bowls were decided on partly because of their relative robustness and ability to stay in tune without frequent retuning and partly because they have a long musical tradition stretching back over a thousand years and would not sound fixed to a particular musical fashion in history and become dated.

Listening and performances

Longplayer could be heard in the relaxation zone of the Millennium Dome in London during its year of opening in 2000. The piece is also played in the 19th century lighthouse at Trinity Buoy Wharf and other public listening posts in the United Kingdom. It can currently be heard in several locations including the Yorkshire Sculpture Park, Horniman Museum and Kings Place. Other listening stations can be found in the United States, Australia and Egypt, where it can still be heard today. It can also be heard via an Icecast Internet stream.

In 2009 a 1000-minute part of the piece was performed with a 26-piece orchestra on a purpose-built stage at the Roundhouse, a former railway turntable building converted to a performing arts venue in Chalk Farm, London. Performers included David Toop and Ansuman Biswas, and the piece was played on what Finer described as a "giant synthesiser built of bronze-age technology." Musicians played in shifts in groups of 6, beginning at 08:20 BST with the performance lasting 16 hours and 40 minutes.

The piece is also available as an app for mobile devices, designed by Joe Hales and Daniel Jones, which runs independently of the piece being broadcast but is exactly in synchronised performance with it.

Four excerpts of Longplayer were released on vinyl LP which accompany a book of the same name written by Finer, along with essays by Kodwo Eshun, Janna Levin,  Margaret and Christine Wertheim.

See also
 As Slow as Possible
 Clock of the Long Now
 Future Library project
 100 Years

References

External links
 listen to Longplayer livestream
 Longplayer website: news, live stream (when available) and more
 Longplayer at Artangel 

Instrumentals
2000 compositions
Musical compositions
Works by English people
2000 establishments in England
Turn of the third millennium